The King's and Lord Treasurer's Remembrancer is an officer in Scotland who represents the Crown's interests in bona vacantia, ultimus haeres and treasure trove.

The K&LTR holds two offices, both instituted at the foundation of the Court of Exchequer in 1707 and which were joined in 1836. The King's Remembrancer was the chief executive officer of the Exchequer under the Barons of Exchequer.  The Lord Treasurer's Remembrancer's principal duty was the examination and audit of the criminal accounts for Scotland. In more recent history, this officer was the Treasury representative on various Scottish government boards and acted as Paymaster-General in Scotland.

From 1835, the King's Rembrancer carried out the duties of the King's Almoner (which office had been suppressed in 1832), including the payment of annuities to those on the royal charity roll.

From 1858 the office of K&LTR was held in conjunction with that of Registrar of Companies, Limited Partnerships and Business Names, auditor of the accounts of sheriff clerks and procurators fiscal, responsible for the collection of fines and penalties imposed in Scottish courts, Keeper of the Edinburgh Gazette, administrator of treasure trove and of estates of deceased persons which fall to the Crown as ultimus haeres, and responsible for the custody of the Regalia of Scotland kept in Edinburgh Castle.

In 1981 the office was transferred to the Crown Agent, the senior officer of the Crown Office and Procurator Fiscal Service. Since 1999 that office has been part of the Scottish Government, and the link with the Treasury and company registration has been severed.

Office holders

King's Remembrancer
Patrick Warrender (1771–1791)
Sir Patrick Murray, 6th Baronet (1799–1837)
Sir Henry Jardine (1820-1831)

Lord Treasurer's Remembrancer
George Robinson (in 1815)

King's/Queen's & Lord Treasurer's Remembrancer

1832: John Henderson
1870: Stair Agnew CB, Advocate
1881: John James Reid, Advocate
1889: Reginald MacLeod of MacLeod CB
1900: Sir Kenneth John Mackenzie Bt
1921: Sir James Adam CBE KC
1926: John Alexander Inglis KC
1942: Percy Jesse Gowlett Rose CB
1948: Wiliam Douglas Collier
1954: Peter Jamieson ISO
1961: William Steel
1964: James Bertie Ian McTavish OBE
1977: David Edmiston Drummond Robertson
1981: W.G Chalmers
1984: Ian Dean
1991: John Duncan Lowe
1996: Andrew Normand
2002: Norman McFadyen CBE
2009: Catherine Patricia Dyer
2016: David Harvie

See also
King's Remembrancer of the Exchequer of Pleas of England

References

External links
 KLTR website

Political office-holders in Scotland
Scots law formal titles
Legal history of Scotland
Scottish chief executives
Public finance of Scotland
Government audit officials
Wills and trusts in the United Kingdom
Personal property law of the United Kingdom
Treasure troves in Scotland